The Miss Ukraine Universe 2016 took place on June 29, 2016 at the Fairmont Grand Hotel Kyiv, in a contest where fifteen contestants from different oblast competed for the crown. The winner Alena Spodynyuk, from Sevastopol, was crowned by the outgoing title holder, Anna Vergelskaya (Miss Ukraine Universe 2015). Spodynyuk will represent Ukraine at Miss Universe 2016.

Winner and runners-up

Special Awards

Top 15

Judges 
 Head of the organizing Committee of the contest "Miss Ukraine Universe", Anna Filimonova
 a leading hotelier of Ukraine, Anastasia Golinskaia
 a patron of art, a public figure, Maksim Glushchenko
 Swedish singer-songwriter, Bosson
 a plastic surgeon of the 1st category, Taras Matolinets
 a fashion designer, Olga Blank
 Ukrainian football player, Yevgenii Levchenko
 Ukrainian gymnast, Oleg Verniaiev
 the programmer from Silicon valley, John Sung Kim

References

External links

2016
2016 beauty pageants
2016 in Ukraine
June 2016 events in Ukraine